The Nova Scotia Open was a golf tournament on the Web.com Tour. It was first played in July 2014 at the Ashburn Golf Club, New Course in Halifax, Nova Scotia.

Winners

Bolded golfers graduated to the PGA Tour via the Web.com Tour regular-season money list.

References

External links
Coverage on the Web.com Tour's official site

Former Korn Ferry Tour events
Golf tournaments in Canada
Sport in Nova Scotia